Sovereign is a science fiction fantasy novel by Ted Dekker and Tosca Lee, published in June 2013.<ref>Ted Dekker on Facebook: Forbidden Draft One -- Welcome to the Dungeon. Retrieved 1/27/2011</ref> It is the conclusion in the trilogy, and was preceded by the novels Forbidden in June 2011 and Mortal (novel)'' in June 2012.

Plot Introduction
In the nine years after Rom Sebastian became the hero of the land, his alliance has suffered enormous setbacks. Only 36 of his truly alive followers survived. A huge battle with the government The Order has left them scattered and deeply divided, unsure of their strategy and power.

Losing hope, Rom and the team must band together and find new allies against The Order, more evil and virulent than ever.

References

Novels by Ted Dekker
2011 American novels
American Christian novels
American thriller novels
FaithWords books